Boris Blank (born July 10, 1978) is a German professional ice hockey player. He is currently an unrestricted free agent who last played for Iserlohn Roosters in the Deutsche Eishockey Liga (DEL). He joined the Roosters as a free agent on June 25, 2014, after previously playing in nine seasons with the Krefeld Pinguine. In the 2016–17 season with the Roosters, Blank contributed with 8 goals and 16 points in 52 games as Iserlohn finished out of playoff contention. On March 3, 2017, it was announced that Blank's contract would not be renewed after three seasons with the Roosters.

References

External links

1978 births
Sportspeople from Karaganda
Kazakhstani people of German descent
German people of Kazakhstani descent
Eisbären Berlin players
Essen Mosquitoes players
Living people
German ice hockey left wingers
Iserlohn Roosters players
Kölner Haie players
Krefeld Pinguine players